I Fine..Thank You..Love You is a 2014 Thai romantic comedy film directed by Mez Tharatorn.

Plot
A Japanese girl, Kaya (Sora Aoi), dumps her Thai boyfriend Yim (pronounced "Jim") (Sunny Suwanmethanon), because he can't speak English and Kaya can't speak Thai. When Kaya leaves for America, Yim, determined to win Kaya's heart back, quickly learns English with a renowned English teacher who runs an English tutorial center, Ms. Pleng (Preechaya Pongthananikorn). Unbeknownst to Yim, Ms. Pleng is Kaya's good friend. Can Yim learn English and win back his love?

Cast
 Preechaya Pongthananikorn as Teacher Pleng
 Sunny Suwanmethanon as Jim
 Sora Aoi as Kaya
 Puttachat Pongsuchat as Tui
 Popetorn Soonthornyanakij as Khun Phrik

Remake
An Indonesian remake, titled  was released on 13 August 2015.

References

External links
 

2014 films
Thai-language films
Thai romantic comedy films
GMM Tai Hub films
2014 romantic comedy films
Thai films remade in other languages